The 2009–10 Vancouver Canucks season was the team's 40th season in the National Hockey League (NHL).

Season events

Off-season

Entry draft
At the 2009 NHL Entry Draft, the Vancouver Canucks drafted seven players. The Canucks did not have their own seventh-round draft pick as it had previously been traded to the Los Angeles Kings in exchange for Jason LaBarbera. The Canucks acquired a sixth-round draft pick from the Phoenix Coyotes in exchange for Shaun Heshka.

Free agency
On July 1, the Vancouver re-signed Daniel and Henrik Sedin to identical five-year, $31 million contracts. The contracts paid both players $6.1 million per season.

On July 3, 2009, Mikael Samuelsson was signed as an unrestricted free agent to a three-year contract worth $2.5 million per season.

The team lost free agent Mattias Öhlund, who had spent the first 11 seasons of his NHL career with Vancouver; he signed a seven-year, $26.25 million contract with the Tampa Bay Lightning.

On August 17, 2009, the Canucks signed prospect Sergei Shirokov to a two-year, $1.75 million contract. Shirokov was drafted in the sixth round of the 2006 NHL Entry Draft.

Trades
On August 28, 2009, general manager Mike Gillis traded prospects centre Patrick White and defenceman Daniel Rahimi to the San Jose Sharks in exchange for defencemen Christian Ehrhoff and Brad Lukowich.

Preseason
As part of the Kraft Hockeyville promotion, the Canucks played the New York Islanders in Terrace, British Columbia, for their first preseason game. The Canucks won by a score of 2–1.

On September 2, Mike Gillis announced that starting goaltender Roberto Luongo had signed a new 12-year, $64 million contract with the team. With Luongo being 30 years old at the time of the extension, the contract effectively ensured that Luongo would be with the Canucks for the remainder of his career. The contract included a modified no-trade clause (NTC): in the fifth year of its term, Luongo would be able to request a trade, and in the seventh year of its term, the Canucks would obtain the right to trade Luongo without his consent.

On September 24, 2009, Mike Gillis signed head coach Alain Vigneault to a new three-year contract. The extension will keep Vigneault behind the bench through the 2012–13 season. Vigneault joined the club in the 2006–07 season and led the Canucks to their two Northwest Division titles in the previous three seasons.

Regular season
The 2010 Winter Olympics took place in Vancouver—the first Winter Olympics in an NHL market since the NHL began to allow its players to compete in Olympic competition. As a result, the Canucks undertook the longest road trip in NHL history, with 14 games over six weeks, from January 27 to March 13, 2010, to allow General Motors Place to be used for ice hockey during the games. GM Place was renamed "Canada Hockey Place" during the games, as the International Olympic Committee doesn't allow corporate sponsorship for venues. The Canucks' former arena, Pacific Coliseum, was also a venue during the games, hosting figure skating and short track speed skating.

On March 19, 2010, forward Ryan Kesler signed a new six-year contract worth $30 million.

On the NHL trade deadline day, March 3, the Canucks acquired defenceman Andrew Alberts from the Carolina Hurricanes in exchange for a third-round pick in the 2010 NHL Entry Draft.

On March 17, 2010, the Canucks signed their first-round draft pick from the 2009 NHL Entry Draft, Jordan Schroeder. The deal was a standard entry-level contract for three years. The contract was for the entry-level maximum of US$900,000 per season along with a $270,000 signing bonus. However, because the contract was signed after the NHL trade deadline, Schroeder was ineligible to play for the Canucks for the remainder of the season. As a result, Schroeder signed an amateur tryout contract with the Canucks' American Hockey League affiliate, the Manitoba Moose.

The Canucks clinched a playoff berth for the second consecutive year with a shootout victory over the Anaheim Ducks on April 2. The Canucks also managed to clinch a second consecutive Northwest Division title when they defeated the Minnesota Wild in overtime on April 4. The win secured the Canucks a top three seed in the 2010 Stanley Cup playoffs and home ice advantage in the first round.

On April 18, 2010, the Canucks signed their 2009 third-round draft pick, Kevin Connauton. The terms of the deal were not disclosed. However, like Schroeder, Connauton was ineligible to play for the Canucks as his contract was signed after the NHL trade deadline.

The Canucks finished the regular season third overall in the Western Conference. They were the second highest scoring team, with 268 goals for, averaging 3.27 goals per game.

Playoffs
The Canucks entered the 2010 Stanley Cup playoffs as the third seed in the Western Conference. This was the first time the Canucks made the playoffs in consecutive seasons since the 2004–05 NHL lockout. In the first round, the Canucks defeated the Los Angeles Kings in six games. The Canucks lost the following round, the Conference Semi-finals, to the Chicago Blackhawks.

Schedule and results

Pre-season

1. Game played in Terrace, British Columbia as part of Kraft Hockeyville promotion

Regular season

Playoffs

Standings

Divisional standings

Conference standings

Player statistics

Skaters

Note: GP = Games played; G = Goals; A = Assists; Pts = Points; +/- = Plus/minus; PIM = Penalty minutes

Goaltenders
Note: GP = Games played; TOI = Time on ice (minutes); W = Wins; L = Losses; OT = Overtime losses; GA = Goals against; GAA= Goals against average; SA= Shots against; SV= Saves; Sv% = Save percentage; SO= Shutouts

†Denotes player spent time with another team before joining Canucks. Stats reflect time with Canucks only.
‡Traded mid-season. Stats reflect time with Canucks only.

Awards and records

Records

Milestones

Awards

Transactions

Trades

Free agents acquiredFree agents lost

Draft picks
Vancouver's picks at the 2009 NHL Entry Draft in Montreal, Quebec.

 This draft pick originally belonged to the Phoenix Coyotes. It was acquired from Phoenix in exchange for Shaun Heshka.

Farm teams
 The Manitoba Moose will remain the Canucks' American Hockey League affiliate for the 2009–10 season.
 The Victoria Salmon Kings will remain the Canucks' ECHL affiliate for the 2009–10 season.

See also
 2009–10 NHL season

References

External links
 2009–10 Vancouver Canucks season at ESPN

Vancouver Canucks season, 2009-10
Vancouver Canucks seasons
Van